"Feels Good" is a song by American R&B/soul singer Rahsaan Patterson, released in 2008. The song is from his fourth studio album, Wines & Spirits. The song peaked at No.76 on Billboard's Hot R&B/Hip-Hop Songs chart, his lowest charting single at that time.

Track listing
US digital single, MP3

Charts

References

2008 singles
Rahsaan Patterson songs
Songs written by Rahsaan Patterson
2006 songs